The Toledo, Peoria and Western Railway  is a short line railroad that operates  of track from Mapleton, Illinois, through Peoria across Illinois to Logansport, Indiana. TP&W has trackage rights between Galesburg, Illinois, and Peoria, between Logansport and Kokomo, Indiana, and between Reynolds, Indiana, and Lafayette, Indiana. TPW has connections with UP, BNSF, NS, CSXT, CN, CP, CERA, CIM, KBSR and T&P. The railroad is now owned by Genesee & Wyoming Inc. The railroad's traffic comes largely from agricultural products, including both raw and processed grain products, as well as chemicals and completed tractors. The TPW hauled around 26,000 carloads in 2008.

Early history
Toledo, Peoria & Western's earliest ancestor was the Peoria and Oquawka Railroad. The eastern extension began construction, three years after its charter, in 1855. The Toledo, Peoria & Warsaw Railway was chartered in 1863, and opened in 1868 from the state line at Indiana across Illinois to the Mississippi River at Warsaw. This line was reorganized as the Toledo, Peoria & Western Railroad in 1880 and leased to the Wabash, St. Louis and Pacific Railway. The lease lasted four years and the Toledo, Peoria & Western Railway took over in 1887.

The Toledo, Peoria & Western Railway was incorporated in Illinois on March 28, 1887, and consolidated the operation of the Toledo, Peoria & Warsaw Railway and the Logansport, Peoria & Burlington Railroad. The LP&B built from Galesburg to East Burlington, Illinois in 1855, and reached Gilman, Illinois in 1857 and Effner in 1859.

A TP&W passenger train was involved in the Great Chatsworth train wreck in Chatsworth, Illinois in 1887.

Courting the Pennsy and the Santa Fe
The Toledo, Peoria & Western Railroad was affiliated with the Pennsylvania Railroad in 1918. This meant that the western terminus for the PRR was in Keokuk, Iowa and the Santa Fe interchange at Lomax, Illinois. In 1937, the TP&W purchased six Class H-10 Northerns from the American Locomotive Company. These locomotives were given road numbers 80 through 85 and were the lightest 4-8-4 ever built for a North American railroad, weighing only 361,000 pounds. They had 69-inch drivers, 23.5 x 30 cylinders, a  boiler pressure and a tractive effort of 51,000 pounds.

In January 1960 the ATSF and PRR gained joint control (half interests) of TP&W. When Conrail was created in 1976 the TP&W acquired the former Pennsylvania Railroad trackage from Effner into Logansport, the Effner Branch, which otherwise would have been abandoned. The value of this trackage diminished in 1981 when Conrail closed the Logansport interchange. At the end of 1970 TP&W operated 239 miles of road on 323 miles of track; in 1970 it reported 520 million ton-miles of revenue freight.

On June 21, 1970, the TP&W's eastbound freight train No. 20 derailed mid-train in Crescent City, Illinois. One of the tank cars punctured, with the released propane igniting and engulfing the other tank cars, destroying most of the business district and several homes and injuring 64.

In 1979 the Santa Fe reached agreement to acquire the former Pennsylvania Railroad's interest in TP&W. TP&W was merged into ATSF on December 31, 1983.

From Santa Fe to Susquehanna
The ATSF sold the Lomax-Peoria-Logansport main line on February 3, 1989, to new investors, former Boston & Maine railroad managers Cynthia O'Connor and Michael Smith, who revived the TP&W name making it an independent railroad again. This represented one of the first female owned acquisitions in the new short-line age.  

When the parent companies of ATSF and Burlington Northern merged in 1995 TP&W was granted operating rights over BN's line between Peoria and Galesburg, Illinois.

In 1995, the New York, Susquehanna and Western Railroad acquired a 40% interest in the TP&W, with full control going to Delaware Otsego Corporation in 1996. During this time, this regional railroad that operates in Illinois and Indiana was dispatched from the DO offices in Cooperstown, New York. Some TP&W locomotives were painted in the NYSW's distinctive yellow-and-black paint scheme during this time. In 1998, TP&W had revenues of approximately $13.4 million and moved over 59,000 freight carloads and intermodal units. It was acquired by RailAmerica in 1999, and it is still operated as TP&W. The Genesee & Wyoming acquired RailAmerica in late 2012, gaining ownership of the TP&W.

Keokuk Junction Railway purchases
The Keokuk Junction Railway now owns parts of the old TP&W line, including the Western Illinois & Keokuk section of TP&W (Fulton, McDonough and Hancock counties in Illinois). In December 1986, KJRY purchased 33.5 miles of former TP&W trackage (then owned by the Santa Fe Railroad) from Keokuk, Iowa, and Warsaw, Illinois, to La Harpe, Illinois. KJRY's feeder line application with the Surface Transportation Board (STB) to acquire the assets of the west end of the new TP&W was granted on 2004-10-28. KJRY completed the acquisition on 2005-02-11, adding 76 miles from LaHarpe to Peoria, the old TP&W main line west of Peoria.

References

External links

Toledo, Peoria & Western Railway (TPW)

Railway companies established in 1887
Railway companies disestablished in 1927
Railway companies established in 1989
Illinois railroads
Indiana railroads
RailAmerica
Companies affiliated with the Pennsylvania Railroad
Former Class I railroads in the United States
Former regional railroads in the United States
Predecessors of the Atchison, Topeka and Santa Fe Railway
Spin-offs of the Atchison, Topeka and Santa Fe Railway
Defunct Iowa railroads
Toledo, Peoria, and Western Railway